Ingoldiomyces is a genus of fungi in the Tilletiaceae family. This is a monotypic genus, containing the single species Ingoldiomyces hyalosporus.

References

External links
 Ingoldiomyces at Index Fungorum

Ustilaginomycotina
Monotypic Basidiomycota genera